Faya! is an album by the reggae musician O-Shen. It was released in 2005 by Sharpnote Records.

Track listing

References 

2005 albums
O-Shen albums